The Pogăniș or Pogănici is a left tributary of the river Timiș in Romania. It discharges into the Timiș in Uliuc. It flows through the villages Ohabița, Delinești, Brebu, Zorlențu Mare, Dezești, Remetea-Pogănici,  Duleu, Valeapai, Vermeș, Cadăr, Blajova, Otvești, Icloda and Uliuc.

Tributaries
The following rivers are tributaries to the river Pogăniș:

Left: Străjești, Igăzău, Valea Popii, Tău, Secu
Right: Valea Calului, Valea Ștefii, Tramnic, Valea Satului

References

Rivers of Romania
Rivers of Timiș County
Rivers of Caraș-Severin County